Stenanthemum pimeleoides, commonly known as spreading stenanthemum or propellor plant, is a species of flowering plant in the family Rhamnaceae and is endemic to Tasmania. It is a small, prostrate, mat-forming shrub with hairy young stems, egg-shaped leaves with the narrower end towards the base, and densely hairy clusters of tube-shaped flowers surrounded by conspicuous, whitish floral leaves.

Description
Stenanthemum pimeleoides is a prostrate, mat-forming shrub that has branches , its young stems covered with shaggy, rust-coloured or greyish hairs. The upper surface of the leaves is glabrous, the lower surface with shaggy hairs pressed against the surface.

Taxonomy and naming
This species was first formally described in 1844 by Joseph Dalton Hooker who gave it the name Cryptandra pimeleoides in his Flora Antarctica from specimens collected by James Backhouse. In 1863, George Bentham changed the name to Stenanthemum pimeleoides in Flora Australiensis. The specific epithet (pimeleoides) means "pimelea-like".

Distribution and habitat
Stenanthemum pimeleoides grows in heath and forest and is endemic to Tasmania, where it grows on the east coast between Orford and Bicheno.

Conservation status
Stenanthemum pimeleoides is listed as "vulnerable" under the Australian Government Environment Protection and Biodiversity Conservation Act 1999 and the Tasmanian Government Threatened Species Protection Act 1995.

References

pimeleoides
Rosales of Australia
Flora of Tasmania
Plants described in 1855
Taxa named by Joseph Dalton Hooker